Henri Rene Darmon (born 22 October 1965) is a French-Canadian mathematician. He is a number theorist who works on Hilbert's 12th problem and its relation with the Birch–Swinnerton-Dyer conjecture. He is currently a James McGill Professor of Mathematics at McGill University.

Career
Darmon received his BSc from McGill University in 1987 and his PhD from Harvard University in 1991 under supervision of Benedict Gross. From 1991 to 1996, he held positions in Princeton University. Since 1994, he has been a professor at McGill University.

Awards
Darmon was elected to the Royal Society of Canada in 2003. In 2008, he was awarded the Royal Society of Canada's John L. Synge Award. He received the 2017 AMS Cole Prize in Number Theory "for his contributions to the arithmetic of elliptic curves and modular forms", and the 2017 CRM-Fields-PIMS Prize, which is awarded in recognition of exceptional research achievement in the mathematical sciences.

References

External links 
 Professor Darmon's webpage

1965 births
Living people
Number theorists
Fellows of the Royal Society of Canada
Canadian mathematicians
Harvard University alumni
McGill University alumni
Academic staff of McGill University
Princeton University faculty